The 1st New York State Legislature, consisting of the New York State Senate and the New York State Assembly, met from September 9, 1777, to June 30, 1778, during the first year of George Clinton's governorship, first at Kingston and later at Poughkeepsie.

Background
The 4th Provincial Congress of the Colony of New York convened at White Plains on July 9, 1776, and declared the independence of the State of New York. The next day the delegates re-convened as the "Convention of Representatives of the State of New-York" and on August 1 a committee was appointed to prepare a State Constitution. The New York Constitution was adopted by the Convention on April 20, 1777, and went into force immediately, without ratification by popular vote.

Apportionment and election
The State Senators were elected on general tickets in the senatorial districts, and were then divided into four classes. Six senators each drew lots for a term of 1, 2, 3 or 4 years and, beginning at the following election in April 1778, every year one fourth of the State Senate seats came up for election to a four-year term.

Assemblymen were elected countywide on general tickets to a one-year term, the whole assembly being renewed annually.

On May 8, 1777, the Constitutional Convention appointed the senators from the Southern District, and the assemblymen from Kings, New York, Queens, Richmond and Suffolk counties—the area which was under British control—and determined that these appointees serve in the Legislature until elections could be held in those areas, presumably after the end of the American Revolutionary War. Vacancies among the appointed members in the Senate should be filled by the Assembly, and vacancies in the Assembly by the Senate.

Sessions
The State Legislature met in Kingston, the seat of Ulster County. The State Senate met first on September 9, 1777, at the home of Abraham Van Gaasbeck, now known as Senate House, the Assembly met first on the next day at the Bogardus Tavern. At the approach of the British army, the State Legislature dispersed on October 7, and reconvened in Poughkeepsie on January 5, 1778, possibly at a house now known as Clinton House.

State Senate

Districts
The Southern District (9 seats) consisted of Kings, New York, Queens, Richmond, Suffolk and Westchester counties.
The Middle District (6 seats) consisted of Dutchess, Orange and Ulster counties.
The Eastern District (3 seats) consisted of Charlotte, Cumberland and Gloucester counties.
The Western District (6 seats) consisted of Albany and Tryon counties.

Note: There are now 62 counties in the State of New York. The counties which are not mentioned in this list had not yet been established, or sufficiently organized, the area being included in one or more of the abovementioned counties. In 1784, Charlotte Co. was renamed Washington Co., and Tryon Co. was renamed Montgomery Co.

Senators
The asterisk (*) denotes members of the Constitutional Convention who continued as members of the Legislature.

Employees
Clerk: Robert Benson
Sergeant-at-Arms: Stephen Hendrickson, elected March 11, 1778
Doorkeeper and Messenger: Victor Bicker

State Assembly

Districts

The City and County of Albany (10 seats)
Charlotte County (4 seats)
Cumberland County (3 seats)
Dutchess County (7 seats)
Gloucester County (2 seats)
Kings County (2 seats)
The City and County of New York (9 seats)
Orange County (4 seats)
Queens County (4 seats)
Richmond County (2 seats)
Suffolk County (5 seats)
Tryon County (6 seats)
Ulster County (6 seats)
Westchester County (6 seats)

Note: There are now 62 counties in the State of New York. The counties which are not mentioned in this list had not yet been established, or sufficiently organized, the area being included in one or more of the abovementioned counties. In 1784, Charlotte Co. was renamed Washington Co., and Tryon Co. was renamed Montgomery Co.

Assemblymen
The asterisk (*) denotes members of the Constitutional Convention who continued as members of the Legislature.

Employees
Clerk: John McKesson
Sergeant-at-Arms: Thomas Pettit
Doorkeeper: Richard Ten Eyck

Notes

Sources
The New York Civil List compiled by Franklin Benjamin Hough (Weed, Parsons and Co., 1858) [see pg. 48-52 for Constitutional Convention; pg. 108 for Senate districts; pg. 110 for senators; pg. 148f for Assembly districts; pg. 157 for assemblymen]

1777 in New York (state)
1778 in New York (state)
001